John Dalrymple, 1st Earl of Stair PC (10 November 1648 – 8 January 1707) was a Scottish politician and lawyer. As Joint Secretary of State in Scotland 1691–1695, he played a key role in suppressing the 1689-1692 Jacobite Rising and was forced to resign in 1695 for his part in the Massacre of Glencoe. Restored to favour under Queen Anne in 1702 and made Earl of Stair in 1703, he was closely involved in negotiations over the 1707 Acts of Union that created the Kingdom of Great Britain but died on 8 January 1707, several months before the Act became law.

Life

John Dalrymple was born in 1648, at Stair House near Kyle, Ayrshire, eldest son of James Dalrymple, Viscount Stair and Margaret Ross-Kennedy. His father James was a prominent lawyer and one of the few Scots involved in the 1650 Treaty of Breda who retained the favour of Charles II after the 1660 Restoration.

In January 1669, John married Elizabeth Dundas (died 25 May 1731), daughter of Sir John Dundas of Newliston and Agnes Gray; they had ten children in all, four of whom reached adulthood: John Dalrymple, 2nd Earl of Stair (1673-1747), Lady Margaret Dalrymple (died 1777), who in 1700 married Hugh Campbell, 3rd Earl of Loudoun, William (1678-1744), and George (1680-1745).

Career
James Dalrymple was author of the Institutions of the Law of Scotland, first published in 1681 but in circulation since the 1660s and generally accepted as 'the foundation of modern Scots law.' With this background, John followed his father into a legal career, as did three of his four brothers and qualified as an Advocate in February 1672.

During the 1639-1651 Wars of the Three Kingdoms, Scottish Royalists and Covenanters both agreed monarchy itself was divinely ordered but disagreed on the nature and extent of Royal authority versus that of the church. Determined to avoid a repeat of the collapse of political authority that had accompanied Covenanter rule, the Royalist view that the Crown was the supreme arbitrator and source of authority became dominant. This meant opposition to the King's authority, legal or otherwise, now became a political act.

In 1681, the future James VII & II was sent to Edinburgh as Lord High Commissioner and in August, the Scottish Parliament passed the Succession Act. This confirmed the divine right of kings, the rights of the natural heir 'regardless of religion,' the duty of all to swear allegiance to the King and the independence of the Scottish Crown.

The Scottish Test Act passed at the same time required all public officials and MPs to swear 'to uphold the true Protestant religion' but also to acknowledge the supremacy of Royal authority in all religious matters. A number of prominent Scots Presbyterians including James Dalrymple and the Earl of Argyll refused to take the Test Act, since not only did it exempt members of the Royal family from making the same commitment but obliged everyone else to accept the King's authority, which caused an obvious problem with the Catholic James. Argyll was put on trial for treason with John Dalrymple as one of his lawyers; he was found guilty and sentenced to death but escaped to the Netherlands.

In January 1682, James Dalrymple also went into exile in Holland; John Graham or Claverhouse who was the military commander in charge of suppressing Presbyterian conventicles in South-West Scotland, quartered his troops on John Dalrymple's property and imposed fines on his tenants. His objections led to Dalrymple's arrest and imprisonment in September 1684; he was not released until November 1685 after James had become King.

Massacre of Glencoe

Treaty of Union 1707

Legacy

Stair's last political action was in the debate over Article XXII of the Act of Union, concerning Scottish representation in the unified Parliament; it was approved on 7 January 1707 and he died in his lodgings the following day, allegedly of apoplexy. He was buried just outside Edinburgh, at Kirkliston, Linlithgowshire.

After his death, his wife Elizabeth, Countess Dowager of Stair, acquired the house in Lady Gray's Close, Edinburgh, built and owned by her grandparents and known as Lady Gray's House. They were renamed Lady Stair's Close and House respectively and now house the Scottish Writer's Museum.

References

Sources

https://web.archive.org/web/20160304073250/http://www.scotlandsplaces.gov.uk/search_item/index.php?service=RCAHMS&id=111898
http://www.capitalcollections.org.uk/index.php?a=ViewItem&i=12542

1648 births
1707 deaths
Earls of Stair
Lord Advocates
Burgh Commissioners to the Parliament of Scotland
People from East Ayrshire
Scottish soldiers
Members of the Privy Council of Scotland
17th-century Scottish peers
17th-century Scottish politicians
Members of the Convention of the Estates of Scotland 1689
Members of the Parliament of Scotland 1689–1702
Members of the Parliament of Scotland 1702–1707
People of the Jacobite rising of 1689